The 80 class are a class of diesel locomotives built by Comeng for the Public Transport Commission between 1978 and 1983.

History

The 80 class were built by Alco's Australian licensee Comeng as an evolution of the 442 class. The 80 class were the first locomotives in Australia to feature factory-fitted cab air-conditioning and fibreglass body panels and the first in New South Wales delivered without buffing plates. To reduce the need for repainting, the fibreglass panels were pre-coloured hence the class retained their original liveries for longer than had previously been the case.

An initial order of 30 was followed by an additional order for 20. The first order were delivered in Indian red livery while the second received the reverse livery with a yellow nose and Indian red wings. They were initially introduced on the Main South line before being transferred to the western region for use between Lithgow and Broken Hill. They quickly spread and regularly hauled freight and passenger services on all main lines.

After being fitted with Australian National radios, 8034-45 commenced operating through to Adelaide with Australian National ALs operating into New South Wales in 1990. Through working ceased in May 1991 when the Australian Federated Union of Locomotive Enginemen placed a ban on the 80 class in South Australia.

Following the formation of National Rail, all were reallocated to the national operator in July 1995. This saw their sphere of operation extended to Melbourne, albeit as trailing locomotives.

Following National Rail taking delivery of the NR class locomotives, the 80s began to return to FreightCorp in January 1997. As they were surplus to requirements, some were placed in store. By April 1997, 30 were in store. In September 1997, 8015 and 8039 were loaned to BHP as a trial on services at their Port Kembla steelworks. All were included in the sale of FreightCorp to Pacific National in February 2002.

In March 2003, 24 of the class were sold to Silverton Rail joining 8043 that had been sold to them in 1999. Four (26, 37, 44 & 49) were returned to traffic as 80s1, 80s4, 80s2 & 80s6. All were included in the sale of the business to Coote Industrial and later Qube Logistics. A fifth (8030) was returned to service in 2010 while the other four resumed their original identities. A few of the others have been scrapped with the remainder in store at Broken Hill, Parkes and Werris Creek.

Pacific National operate 4 mainly as shunters at Keswick, Broken Hill and Morandoo with 10 in store at Chullora and Werris Creek.

Fleet status

References

Further reading

 Railpage – 80 Class Locomotive

Co-Co locomotives
Commonwealth Engineering locomotives
Diesel locomotives of New South Wales
Pacific National diesel locomotives
Railway locomotives introduced in 1978
Standard gauge locomotives of Australia
Diesel-electric locomotives of Australia